Lake City is a city in Florence County, South Carolina, United States. The population was 6,675 at the 2010 census. Located in central South Carolina, it is south of Florence and included as part of the Florence Metropolitan Statistical Area.

History
The Lake City area was originally part of Williamsburg Township, which was first settled by a group of Scots-Irish in 1736. It was first called "Graham's Crossroads" and then "Graham", after Aaron Graham, a land owner around the crossroads that now form Church and Main streets in Lake City.

In 1856, the Northeastern Railroad built its main line through the area. This brought new growth to the community. On March 4, 1874, after requests from residents, a city charter was granted to the new town of Graham. On December 24, 1883, the town changed its name to "Lake City", after the swimming lakes just north of town. This was at the request of the locally-serving Lynches Lake Post Office, since there was another post office in South Carolina known as that.

This small town had a population of 300 in 1893, and by 1898 the area had become the leading strawberry cropland in South Carolina.

Lake City was the site of a notorious lynching on February 22, 1898, that resulted in the mob murders of the city's black postmaster and his infant daughter.

Lake City was at one time called the "Bean Capital of the World", and the Bean Market downtown has now been converted into an event rental and civic center facility. The building was built in 1936 by the Public Works Administration (PWA), and was a central hub for farmers across the South to get their beans to market. The building is listed in the National Register of Historic Places as a contributing property in the Lake City Downtown Historic District.  Also listed on the National Register of Historical Places is the W.T. Askins House.

Government
Lake City's city government includes a mayor (elected for a four-year term), an appointed city administrator, and a six-person city council (elected to single-member districts for a four-year staggered term of office). The city's mayor is Yamekia Robinson.

Geography
Lake City is located in southern Florence County at  (33.867697, -79.756153). U.S. Route 52 is the main highway through the city, leading north  to Florence, the county seat, and south  to Kingstree.

Lake Swamp drains the northern part of the city, flowing east to the Lynches River and then the Pee Dee River.

Demographics

2020 census

As of the 2020 United States Census, there were 5,903 people, 2,415 households, and 1,568 families residing in the city.

2000 census
As of the census of 2000, there were 6,478 people, 2,409 households, and 1,705 families residing in the city. The population density was 1,365.0 people per square mile (526.6/km2). There were 2,704 housing units at an average density of 569.8 per square mile (219.8/km2). The racial makeup of the city was 71.43% African American, 27.18% White, 0.08% Native American, 0.34% Asian, 0.28% from other races, and 0.69% from two or more races. Hispanic or Latino of any race were 1.10% of the population.

There were 2,409 households, out of which 33.3% had children under the age of 18 living with them, 36.6% were married couples living together, 30.5% had a female householder with no husband present, and 29.2% were non-families. 26.7% of all households were made up of individuals, and 11.2% had someone living alone who was 65 years of age or older. The average household size was 2.67 and the average family size was 3.25.

In the city, the population was spread out, with 29.7% under the age of 18, 9.5% from 18 to 24, 25.8% from 25 to 44, 21.5% from 45 to 64, and 13.5% who were 65 years of age or older. The median age was 34 years. For every 100 females, there were 79.7 males. For every 100 females age 18 and over, there were 71.4 males.

The median income for a household in the city was $22,534, and the median income for a family was $32,111. Males had a median income of $26,316 versus $19,679 for females. The per capita income for the city was $14,452. About 26.9% of families and 31.6% of the population were below the poverty line, including 45.0% of those under age 18 and 25.3% of those age 65 or over.

Education
Lake City has a public library, a branch of the Florence County Library System.

Notable people 

 Derrick Burgess (b. 1978), NFL player with the Oakland Raiders
 Brad J. Cox (1944-2021), co-creator of the programming language Object-C, which became the basis for languages used to build Mac OS and iOS (obituary)
D. T. Cromer (David Thomas Cromer, b. 1971 in Lake City), Major League Baseball player
 Tripp Cromer (Roy Bunyan Cromer, b. 1967 in Lake City), Major League Baseball player
 Derrick Faison (1967 – 2004), professional football player for the Los Angeles Rams; died from an undetected heart condition, hypertrophic cardiomyopathy
 Ronald McNair (1950 – 1986), graduate of North Carolina A&T State University, one of the astronauts killed during the launch of the space shuttle Challenger mission STS-51-L
 Darla Moore, a partner of the private investment firm Rainwater, Inc; a pioneering woman in the banking industry and a benefactor to many institutions in her home state of South Carolina

References

External links
 Lake City official website
 Greater Lake City Chamber of Commerce

Cities in South Carolina
Cities in Florence County, South Carolina
Populated places established in 1736
1736 establishments in the Thirteen Colonies
Florence, South Carolina metropolitan area